Wayne Willgress (born 1988) in Mulbarton, Norfolk, is an English male lawn and indoor bowler.

Bowls career
Willgress was an England Junior international and was the National triples champion in 2007 and singles runner-up in 2012 during the Men's National Championships.

He knocked out the world number one Greg Harlow to reach the semi finals of the 2018 World Indoor Bowls Championship. Willgress reached the quarter finals of Men's Singles at the 2021 World Indoor Bowls Championship but he and his quarter final opponent Perry Martin were both forced to withdraw following a positive Coronavirus test.

In 2021, he won the pairs National title with John Tufts.

Personal life
His wife is England international Rebecca Willgress, formerly Rebecca Field.

References

1988 births
Living people
English male bowls players
People from Mulbarton, Norfolk
Sportspeople from Norfolk